Transylvania was the name of a trilogy of computer games released for several home computers of the 1980s.  The games were graphic adventure games created by Antonio Antiochia and produced by Penguin Software/Polarware.

Transylvania

In 1982, this game was released for the Apple II, followed by conversions to the Atari 8-bit family and Commodore 64. It was later released for Macintosh in 1984, then the Amiga, Atari ST and DOS in 1985.

The Crimson Crown - Further Adventures in Transylvania

Released in 1985 under the title The Crimson Crown, on the same platforms as its predecessor.  The game tasks the player with a quest to defeat a magical vampire with the assistance of Princess Sabrina (who is now a fledgling magician) and the heir to the throne, Prince Erik.

Transylvania III - Vanquish the Night

Released in 1989 under the title Transylvania III: Vanquish The Night, this game was released for Apple IIGS and PC.  It used VGA graphics (PC version), more complex puzzles and a larger vocabulary.  The game also had some digital voice and many of the puzzles involved references to ancient mythology.  In this game the player had to vanquish an evil king.

Legacy 
Many years later, Penguin Software released several of the game series as freeware.

Also after end of official support, an enthusiast reconstructed a source code variant of the game's series engine to port it to modern platforms.

References

External links
 
 more on PolarWare

1980s interactive fiction
1982 video games
1985 video games
1989 video games
Amiga games
Apple II games
Apple IIGS games
Atari 8-bit family games
Atari ST games
Commodore 64 games
DOS games
Freeware games
Classic Mac OS games
Video game franchises
Video games developed in the United States